Gary Thomas Knapp (born 1947) is a former New Zealand politician of the Social Credit Party.

Political career

Knapp joined Bruce Beetham in parliament, where they both had high profiles. In 1981 Knapp was elected deputy leader at the party's annual conference.

Beetham continued as leader despite losing his seat and in 1985 Knapp failed to convince him to stand aside. Beetham did endorse Knapp to succeed him whenever he chose to retire. Beetham kept stalling his retirement leading to Knapp resigning as deputy leader in protest. Morrison was later elected to replace Beetham as leader.

In the  Knapp and Morrison were both defeated by National candidates. The next year Morrison resigned as leader and Knapp was elected at the party's 1988 conference as leader. In November that same year Knapp and eleven supporters entered Parliament House in Wellington and locked themselves in a committee room. They occupied the room for two days using the publicity to demand the government keep its word to hold a referendum on switching to a proportional representation electoral system. Following the occupation, the Speaker of the House of Representatives, Kerry Burke, stripped Knapp of his privileges as a former Member of Parliament which barred him from entering parliament buildings (unless accompanied by an MP) and claiming reduced air fares. Knapp claimed the move was "petty" and would cost him $10,000 a year in air fares and claimed it was motivated by a government wishing to restrict the movements of its political opponents. Afterwards he was challenged for the party leadership at the 1990 party conference by Mary Tierney, the Democrat candidate for Eden, but he easily defeated the challenge by 90 votes to 8.

In 1990, Knapp was awarded the New Zealand 1990 Commemoration Medal. He decided to step down as leader at the 1991 party conference.

Knapp was always critical of the Democrats decision to join the Alliance which he charged with overwhelming the Democrats identity due to being dominated by the NewLabour Party and in 1996 he quit the party. Following his breaking with the Democrats he was involved with New Zealand First.

After leaving active politics he became a real estate agent in 1993, first in Auckland and later Port Macquarie, Australia.

Notes

References

1947 births
Living people
Members of the New Zealand House of Representatives
New Zealand Democratic Party for Social Credit politicians
New Zealand First politicians
New Zealand MPs for Auckland electorates
Social Credit Party (New Zealand) MPs
Unsuccessful candidates in the 1978 New Zealand general election
Unsuccessful candidates in the 1987 New Zealand general election
Unsuccessful candidates in the 1990 New Zealand general election